Luria lurida is a species of sea snail, a cowry, a marine gastropod mollusk in the family Cypraeidae, the cowries.

Description
The dorsum surface of these elongated, smooth and shiny shells is mainly pale brown or reddish, with three transversal darker bands alternating with narrower clearer bands. At the extremities of the shell there are two separate dark brown spots. The aperture is wide, with several teeth. In the living cowries the mantle is dark brown and may cover the entire shell. The male is usually smaller and elongated than the female.

Distribution
This common species is distributed in Mediterranean Sea and in the seas along Cape Verde, Azores, Canaries and West Africa, mainly in Senegal and Angola.

Habitat
As they fear the light, during the day usually they hide themselves in small caves, crevices or under rocks up to about of depth. They live on rocky seabed and corals, feeding during the night mainly on sponges of Verongia aerophoba, Aiplysina aerophoba, Chondrilla nucula and Tethya aurantium.

Subspecies
Three subspecies have been recognized :
 Luria lurida lurida  (Linnaeus, 1758) 
 Luria lurida minima  (Dunker, 1853)   (taxon inquirendum)
 Luria lurida oceanica (Schilder, 1930)
 Luria lurida pulchroides  Alvardo & Alvarez, 1964   (taxon inquirendum)

Synonyms
 Cypraea amethistina Costa O.G., 1830
 Cypraea aurora Monterosato, 1897 
 Cypraea kunthii Audouin, 1826
 Cypraea leucogaster Gmelin, 1791
 Cypraea lurida  Linnaeus, 1758   (original combination)
 Cypraea lurida congiunta Settepassi, 1977 (not available, published in a work which does not consistently use binomial nomenclature (ICZN art. 11.4))
 Cypraea lurida elongata Settepassi, 1977 (not available, published in a work which does not consistently use binomial nomenclature (ICZN art. 11.4))
 Cypraea lurida immaculata Settepassi, 1977 (not available, published in a work which does not consistently use binomial nomenclature (ICZN art. 11.4))
 Cypraea lurida oceanica Schilder, 1930 
 Cypraea lurida var. albida Costa O.G., 1829 
 Cypraea lurida var. brunnea Monterosato, 1897 
 Cypraea lurida var. caerulescens Mollerat, 1890 
 Cypraea lurida var. cinerea Monterosato, 1897 
 Cypraea lurida var. concolor Kobelt, 1906 
 Cypraea lurida var. curta Mollerat, 1890 
 Cypraea lurida var. cylindrica Mollerat, 1890 
 Cypraea lurida var. fasciata Monterosato, 1897 
 Cypraea lurida var. fulva Mollerat, 1890 
 Cypraea lurida var. major Pallary, 1900 
 Cypraea lurida var. maxima Monterosato, 1897 
 Cypraea lurida var. media Monterosato, 1897 
 Cypraea lurida var. minima Dunker, 1853 
 Cypraea lurida var. monochroa Mollerat, 1890 
 Cypraea lurida var. monstrosa Gray J.E., 1828 
 Cypraea lurida var. nebulosa Monterosato, 1897 
 Cypraea lurida var. normalis Monterosato, 1897 
 Cypraea lurida var. pubescens Monterosato, 1897 
 Cypraea lurida var. rufescens Costa O.G., 1829 
 Cypraea lurida var. rufofulva Kobelt, 1906 
 Cypraea lurida var. turdicula Monterosato, 1897 
 Cypraea lurida var. ventricosa Mollerat, 1890 
 Cypraea lurida var. virescens Costa O.G., 1829 
 Cypraea lurida var. zonata Mollerat, 1890 
 Luria lurida lurida (Linnaeus, 1758)· accepted, alternate representation
 Luria lurida var. badia Coen, 1949 
 Luria lurida var. incrassata Coen, 1933 
 Luria lurida var. liburnica Coen, 1933 
 Luria lurida var. obstructa Coen, 1933 
 Luria lurida var. onycina Coen, 1933 
 Lurida lurida  (Linnaeus, 1758)  (misspelling)
 Voluta pumilio Brusina, 1865

References

 Monterosato T. A. (di) (1897 (1 luglio)). Sur les Cypraea de la Méditerranée. Journal de Conchyliologie 45 (3): 153-165, Tab VI 
 Gofas, S.; Le Renard, J.; Bouchet, P. (2001). Mollusca, in: Costello, M.J. et al. (Ed.) (2001). European register of marine species: a check-list of the marine species in Europe and a bibliography of guides to their identification. Collection Patrimoines Naturels, 50: pp. 180–213
 Rolán E., 2005. Malacological Fauna From The Cape Verde Archipelago. Part 1, Polyplacophora and Gastropoda
 Repetto G., Orlando F. & Arduino G. (2005): Conchiglie del Mediterraneo, Amici del Museo "Federico Eusebio", Alba, Italy [as Luria lurida (Linné, 1758)]
 Prats Pi, L. (2002): Gastròpodes marins de la cala de Binissafúller, Menorca (Illes Balears) Molluscat, Spira, 1(2): 21-24 [as Lurida lurida (Linnaeus, 1758)]
 Doneddu M. 1999. Some notes about range, habitat and ecology of the Mediterranean species of Cypraeidae. The Festivus 31 ( 8 ): 87-91. San Diego
 Coen G. (1933). Saggio di una Sylloge Molluscorum Adriaticorum. Memorie del Regio Comitato Talassografico Italiano 192: pp. i-vii, 1-186
 Coen G. (1949). Nota su alcune forme nuove di Cypreacea. Hist. Natur 3 (1): 13-18
 Settepassi F. (1977). Atlante Malacologico. I molluschi marini viventi nel Mediterraneo, volume II. 304 pp. Museo di Zoologia, Roma
 Rolán E., 2005. Malacological Fauna From The Cape Verde Archipelago. Part 1, Polyplacophora and Gastropoda.

External links
 Biolib
 Sea-shell
 Flmnh
 
 Linnaeus, C. (1758). Systema Naturae per regna tria naturae, secundum classes, ordines, genera, species, cum characteribus, differentiis, synonymis, locis. Editio decima, reformata [10th revised edition, vol. 1: 824 pp. Laurentius Salvius]
 Costa O. G. (1830 ["1829") Catalogo sistematico e ragionato de' testacei delle Due Sicilie. Tipografia della Minerva, Napoli. pp. 1-8, i-cxxxii, pl. 1-3]
  Audouin V. (1826) Explication sommaire des planches de Mollusques de l'Egypte et de la Syrie publiées par J.C. Savigny. in: Description de l'Egypte ou recueil des observations et des recherches qui ont été faites en Egypte pendant l'expédition de l'armée française, publié par les ordres de sa majesté l'empereur Napoléon le grand. Histoire Naturelle, Animaux invertébrés 1(4): 7-56. Paris: Imprimerie impériale
 Gmelin J.F. (1791). Vermes. In: Gmelin J.F. (Ed.) Caroli a Linnaei Systema Naturae per Regna Tria Naturae, Ed. 13. Tome 1(6). G.E. Beer, Lipsiae [Leipzig. pp. 3021-3910]
 Brusina S. (1865). Conchiglie dalmate inedite. Verhandlungen der Kaiserlich-königlichen Zoologisch-botanisch Gesellschaft in Wien. 15: 3-42
 Pallary, P. (1900). Coquilles marines du littoral du département d'Oran. Journal de Conchyliologie. 48(3): 211-422.
 Gofas, S.; Le Renard, J.; Bouchet, P. (2001). Mollusca. in: Costello, M.J. et al. (eds), European Register of Marine Species: a check-list of the marine species in Europe and a bibliography of guides to their identification. Patrimoines Naturels. 50: 180-213

Cypraeidae
Gastropods described in 1758
Taxa named by Carl Linnaeus
Molluscs of the Atlantic Ocean
Molluscs of the Mediterranean Sea